Tanzeb  was another variety of muslin with a reasonably fine weave structure commonly used for chikan embroidery. The cloth was purposely woven in specified lengths, for instance, 19-20 yards for the convenience of embroidery work and subsequent usages like Dupattas and pieces for garments such as Angarkhas.

Meaning 
Tanzeb means what adorns the body. It is a combination word where Tan means body, and Zeb refers to an ornament. Hence the cloth was known for decorating the body.

Origin 
Tanzeb was originated in the second half of the eighteenth century during the reign of Āsaf al-daulah.

Production 
Raebareli district and the town of Jais were reputably manufacturing Tanzeb.

Use 
Tanzeb used for various headdresses and garments such as caps, turbans, angrakhas, and handkerchieves. Tanzeb was among the various cotton qualities exported to England.

References 

Woven fabrics